Eryaman YHT railway station, previously known as Ankara West YHT railway station, is a railway station in Ankara, Turkey. Once Başkentray commuter rail service begins in April, the station will become a transfer point between YHT high-speed trains and local commuter trains, replacing Sincan station.

Eryaman YHT station consists of two island platforms serving four tracks, with two more tracks for bypassing trains. A large station building houses a waiting lounge, cafes and ticket offices. Next to the station is the Etimesgut Yard, opened in February 2016, which is a large maintenance facility and train yard for YHT train-sets.

Station Layout

References

Railway stations in Ankara Province
Railway stations opened in 2018
High-speed railway stations in Turkey